Robert Edmond Jones (December 12, 1887 – November 26, 1954) was an American scenic, lighting, and costume designer.

He is credited with incorporating the new stagecraft into the American drama. His designs sought to integrate scenic elements into the storytelling instead of having them stand separate and indifferent from the play's action. His visual style, often referred to as simplified realism, combined bold vivid use of color and simple, yet dramatic, lighting.

Life

Born in Milton, New Hampshire, Jones attended Harvard University and graduated in 1910. Jones eventually moved to New York (1912), where, with friends made at Harvard, he began to do small design jobs. In 1913 Jones and several friends sailed to Europe to study the new stagecraft with Edward Gordon Craig in Florence. The school in Florence would not accept Jones, so he went to Berlin instead, spending a year in informal study with Max Reinhardt's Deutsches Theater.

For a 1915 production of The Man Who Married a Dumb Wife directed by Harley Granville-Barker, Jones designed a fairly simple set that complemented the action and the other design elements of the production rather than overwhelming it.

His innovative designs for Vladimir Rosing's American Opera Company in 1927 and 1928 were praised by critics.

Jones also brought his expressionistic style to many productions put on by the Theatre Guild, with innovative designs for The Philadelphia Story (1937), Othello (1943), and The Iceman Cometh (1946). Jones's biggest commercial success was with The Green Pastures (1930), which, if we include its revival in 1951, played for a total of 1,642 performances. This revival was Jones's last production. Other Broadway credits include Holiday (1928), Mourning Becomes Electra (1931), Ah, Wilderness! (1933), Juno and the Paycock (1940), and Lute Song (1946). Jones was also the production designer for some early three-color Technicolor films, such as La Cucaracha (1934) and Becky Sharp (1935), for which he also designed the costumes.

One of the early members of the Provincetown Players, Jones worked closely with his friend Eugene O'Neill on many of his productions including Anna Christie, The Great God Brown, and Desire Under the Elms.

Jones published many articles on theatre design in the course of his career. His books include Drawings for the Theatre (1925), and The Dramatic Imagination (1941); he also illustrated Kenneth Macgowan's Continental Stagecraft (1922).

His book The Dramatic Imagination is considered the definitive work on modern stage design in the first half of the 20th century.

He died in the house he was born in on Thanksgiving Day, 1954.

References

External links

Robert Edmond Jones designs and originals, 1913-1943, held by the Billy Rose Theatre Division, New York Public Library for the Performing Arts
Robert Edmond Jones correspondence, 1930-1941, held by the Billy Rose Theatre Division, New York Public Library for the Performing Arts
Costume and Scenic Design Collection at the Harry Ransom Center

Harvard University alumni
American scenic designers
Broadway set designers
American costume designers
American lighting designers
1887 births
1954 deaths
People from Milton, New Hampshire
Members of the American Academy of Arts and Letters